Diego Alberto Torres (born 3 July 1982 in Bragado) is an Argentine retired footballer

Career

Torres started his career in Quilmes Atlético Club where he played 105 games and scored 10 goals. He was part of the team that won promotion from the 2nd division and qualified for Copa Libertadores in the following season. Subsequently, he joined Newell's Old Boys. Torres lost his place in the Newell's team due to an injury he sustained in his 4th game with the Rosario club. He returned for the 2008 Apertura and scored a game winner against Lanús.

Honours
Arsenal
Argentine Primera División (1): 2012 Clausura

External links
 Argentine Primera statistics at Fútbol XXI 
 

1982 births
Living people
Sportspeople from Buenos Aires Province
Argentine footballers
Argentine Primera División players
Primera Nacional players
Primera B Metropolitana players
Newell's Old Boys footballers
Quilmes Atlético Club footballers
Arsenal de Sarandí footballers
Crucero del Norte footballers
Club Almirante Brown footballers
Association football midfielders